Romanians in Turkey includes Turkish citizens of Romanian origin (including Turkish-Romanian origin), as well as Romanian citizens resident in Turkey. 

Romanians are generally concentrated in the major cities in Turkey, especially Istanbul, where 14,000 Romanians reside and where there is also a Romanian Orthodox Church.

History
Romanians have migrated to the modern-day territory of Turkey since the Ottoman times, whene they were taken as Devshirme from the Danubian Principalities to become janissaries. Also during the Ottoman period, an important Romanian colony was established in Constantinople (then capital of the Ottoman Empire, modern-day Istanbul). A Romanian Orthodox Church was built there by the Wallachian ruler Constantin Brâncoveanu, which even today is an important center of the local Romanian community.

After Romanian won its independence from the Ottoman Empire, some Dobrujan Turks started to emigrate to modern-day Turkey.

During the communist rule of Romania, another wave of Romanian Turks, as well as Romanian Tatars and ethnic Romanians emigrated to Turkey. After the Romanian revolution, a significant number of Romanian entrepreneurs started investing and establishing business ventures in Turkey, and a certain proportion chose to take up residence there (especially in Istanbul). There are also Romanian migrant workers, as well as students and artists living in Turkey. During this period, many Romanians intermarried and assimilated with locals, bringing a rapid increase in mixed marriages.

Notable people
, poet
, politician
Nejla Ateş, belly dancer 
, politician 
, one of the first Turkish publishers in Turkey
Basri Dirimlili, football player 
, Turkish politician 
, politician
Kemal Karpat, historian and academic
Mirela Dulgheru, long jumper
Ianis Hagi, footballer
Meral Yıldız Ali, table tennis player
Emin Bektöre, folklorist
Eren Eyüboğlu, painter
Racoviță family
Alexandros Kallimachis, statesman
Pertevniyal Sultan, thirteenth consort of Sultan Mahmud II
, revolutionary
Bujor Hoinic, conductor

See also 
 Romania–Turkey relations 
 Turks of Romania

References
 

European diaspora in Turkey
 
Romanian diaspora